The 11107 / 11108 Bundelkhand Express is an Express train belonging to Indian Railways – North Central Railway zone that runs between  and . It is also an ISO certified train .

It operates with train number 11107 from Gwalior Junction to Banaras and with train number 11108 in the reverse direction, serving the state of Uttar Pradesh and Madhya Pradesh.

It is named after the Bundelkhand region of the states of Madhya Pradesh and Uttar Pradesh.

Coaches

The 11107/11108 Bundelkhand Express has 1 AC First Class cum AC 3 tier, 1 AC 2 tier, 8 Sleeper class, 6 General Unreserved & 2 SLR (Seating cum Luggage Rake) Coaches. It does not carry a pantry car.

As is customary with most train services in India, coach composition may be amended at the discretion of Indian Railways depending on demand.

Service

As the average speed of the train is below , as per Indian Railways rules, its fare does not include a Superfast surcharge.

Routeing

The 11107/11108 Bundelkhand Expres' runs from Gwalior Junction via , Banda Junction, Manikpur Junction, Janghai Junction to Banaras.

Traction

Previously, a Jhansi / Mughalsarai-based WDM-3A locomotive powered the train for its entire journey as large sections of the route were not electrified.

With progressive electrification, it is now hauled by a Kanpur-based WAP-7 or Jhansi-based WAP-4 locomotive between Banaras and Gwalior Junction.

References

External links

Named passenger trains of India
Rail transport in Madhya Pradesh
Passenger trains originating from Varanasi
Transport in Gwalior
Express trains in India